The Serica was a clipper built in 1863 by Robert Steele & Co., at Greenock on the south bank of the Clyde, Scotland, for James Findlay. She was the last-but-one wooden clipper built by Steele before the yard went over to building composite clippers.

Winner of 1864 Tea Race
Serica is Latin for "China"—the ship was built expressly for the China tea trade. Serica participated in the annual "tea races" to bring the new season's crop to London; she won in 1864. In 1865 she was the leading ship off Beachy Head, but failed to get a tug to take her on to London, so was beaten by 12 hours by Fiery Cross.  In The Great Tea Race of 1866, she came in third, by a matter of hours.

Sailing performance
According to Basil Lubbock, the tea clippers Serica, Fiery Cross, Lahloo and Taeping performed at their best in light breezes, as they were all rigged with single topsails.

Loss of the ship
On her final voyage under Capt. George Innes, she left Hong Kong bound for Montevideo, 2 November 1872, and was wrecked on the Paracels, in the South China Sea the following day. Out of a crew of twenty-three that manned her, only one survived.

See also 
List of clipper ships

Notes

External links
Newspaper notices of the Serica's arrival in New York, 28 December 1871

Tea clippers
Victorian-era merchant ships of the United Kingdom
Ships built on the River Clyde
Shipwrecks in the South China Sea
1863 ships